William Malatinsky is an American author and frequent contributor to the Virginia Quarterly Review.  His fiction was short-listed for the Best American Short Stories in 2006 and 2010.

He graduated from Kalamazoo College in 2002.

References

Year of birth missing (living people)
Living people
American male poets
American male short story writers
American short story writers
Kalamazoo College alumni
Writers from Seattle